National Tertiary Route 505, or just Route 505 (or ) is a National Road Route of Costa Rica, located in the Heredia province.

Description
In Heredia province the route covers Sarapiquí canton (Puerto Viejo district).

References

Highways in Costa Rica